Subterranean Home Sick Blues: A Tribute to Bob Dylan's Bringing It All Back Home is a 2010 digitally-released tribute to Bob Dylan's album Bringing It All Back Home. Sixteen artists collaborated to compile the album, which was released on October 5, 2010, by Reimagine Music.

The first eleven songs of the compilation appeared on Dylan's Bringing It All Back Home. The twelfth song was released only as a single, while the final four songs appeared on Dylan's official "bootleg" albums.

Track listing 
All tracks are written by Bob Dylan. Unless noted, the songs originally appeared on Bringing It All Back Home.

See also
List of songs written by Bob Dylan
List of artists who have covered Bob Dylan songs

References 

Folk rock albums
Bob Dylan tribute albums